Compound Fracture is a 2013 American supernatural thriller. Co-written and starring Tyler Mane, the film also features veterans of the horror genre such as Derek Mears and Muse Watson.

Plot

The film revolves around Michael Wolffsen (Tyler Mane), who is engaged to Juliette (Renae Geerlings), and both take care of teenager Brandon (Alex Saxon). The teenager is Michael's nephew, the son of his sister Chloe (Susan Angelo), who has died.

After a call from Michael and Chloe's father, Gary (Muse Watson), the trio arrives to the family estate to meet him and learn that he has dementia and loses his mind. Gary's new wife, Annabelle (Leslie Easterbrook), takes care of him but has decided to leave him because he was abusive and beat her.

Things turn dark after an obscure presence arrives with them and starts chasing them. Odd accidents and curious wounds happen. Gary tries to warn them, but because of his dementia, nobody believes him and doesn't trust them.  We learn that Michael had shot and killed William, his brother-in-law, and Brandon's dad after William stabbed Chloe when she attempted to leave him and move in with Michael and Juliette.

Gary is surprised to know that William's ghost is there because only those with Nordic marks carved on their skin for a passage ritual can stay lingering in the place the ritual has been done. Soon the group discovers that Chloe had carved the rune into her family years ago before William became abusive. Annabelle walks away from protection and is murdered by the ghost with her niece.

A pair of cops who come to check the estate also are taken and savagely killed by ghost William, who is furious and seeking revenge against those who had taken his life.

A battle against William starts as they try to undo the bond done by Chloe and banish him once William breaks the spiritual defenses in the house.
Gary does the only thing he thinks he can do to fight him and takes his life, giving the opportunity to Michael to banish William.
After the bitter triumph, the surviving trio leaves the estate.

Cast
Tyler Mane as Michael Wolffsen
Muse Watson as Gary Wolffsen
Derek Mears as William
Renae Geerlings as Juliette 
Leslie Easterbrook as Annabelle 
Alex Saxon as Brandon
Jelly Howie as Christine
Susan Angelo as Chloe
Todd Farmer as Jack 
Daniel Roebuck as Jim

Release
Compound Fracture was exclusively screened in Los Angeles on September 25, 2012. Throughout 2013, Mane and Geerlings embarked on a limited release and film festival tour in major cities across the United States and Canada, starting with Mane's hometown of Saskatoon, Saskatchewan. The film opened the Dark Matters Film Festival in Albuquerque, New Mexico, and was the official selection at the Gold Coast International Film Festival.

Compound Fracture was released on DVD on May 13, 2014.

Reception
HorrorSociety.com gave the film 4.5 out of 5 'skulls,' noting, "This film is the ultimate proof that you do not need to have a major studio or millions of dollars behind you to make horror gold." Fangoria called the film "a solid first outing from Mane Entertainment, utilizing an excellent cast in a layered story of madness, knotted family roots, and supernatural revenge."

Dread Central gave the film 3.5 out of 5 stars, going on to say, "These days, in a 'been there, seen that' genre world where there seems to be very few surprises left for us fans, Mane and his co-writer Geerlings deliver a fantastic little supernatural revenge tale that should keep the indie genre fans out there pleased."

The film was awarded "Best of Festival" at the 2013 Hot Springs Horror Film Festival.

References

External links
 
 
  
  
 
 

2013 horror films
American independent films
American ghost films
2013 films
2010s ghost films
Uxoricide in fiction
2010s English-language films
2010s American films